Coda is a 1987 Australian made-for-TV horror mystery film directed by Craig Lahiff who described it as "very much a telefilm. I suppose it's very Hitchcocky - and de Palma inspired." It was the first of three films Lahiff had arranged finance for which were made in succession. The film focuses on a serial killer targeting female university students.

It was shot on location at Flinders University on 16mm and features women in all the lead roles.

Cast
Penny Cook as Kate Martin
Arna-Maria Winchester as Dr. Steiner
Liddy Clark as Sally Reid
Patrick Frost as Mike Martin
Vivienne Greaves as Anna
Olivia Hamnett as Det. Sgt. Turner
Adrian Shirley as a real estate agent
Bob Newman as a psychiatrist

References

External links

Coda at Oz Movies

1987 television films
1987 films
1987 horror films
1980s horror thriller films
1987 independent films
1980s mystery films
1980s mystery thriller films
1980s psychological thriller films
1980s serial killer films
1980s slasher films
Australian independent films
Australian slasher films
Australian thriller films
Films about miscarriage of justice
Films set in South Australia
Films set in universities and colleges
Films shot in Adelaide
Horror television films
Mystery horror films
1980s Australian films